The Exotic Tour/Summer Tour '94 was a 1994 concert tour by English electronic group Depeche Mode in support of the act's eighth studio album, Songs of Faith and Devotion, which was released in March 1993. The tour is an extension of the Devotional Tour in 1993, which reached Europe and North America.
The tour visited territories which the band had never performed in or had not toured in for some time, reaching Africa, Asia, Australia, and South America. The tour commenced in Johannesburg, South Africa in early February. As of 2016, this was the last tour the group visited Australia, Southeast Asia or South Africa. In May 1994, the group visited North America on the "Summer Tour, '94". This was the second leg of North American dates promoting Songs of Faith and Devotion and took place mostly in outdoor venues and amphitheatres.

The tour marked a tumultuous time for the group, with keyboardist Andrew Fletcher taking leave from touring duties after two months due to "mental instability" and lead singer Dave Gahan's continuing issues with drug addiction. Fletcher was replaced by Daryl Bamonte on all dates from April to July. This is the last tour with Alan Wilder as a member of Depeche Mode.

Setlist

"Rush" (Alan Wilder on drums)
"Halo" (Alan Wilder on drums)
"Behind the Wheel" (Martin Gore on guitar)
"Everything Counts"
"World in My Eyes"
"Walking in My Shoes" (Martin Gore on guitar)
"Stripped" (Alan Wilder on drums)
 Song performed by Martin Gore
"Condemnation" (excluding Johannesburg dates)
Song performed by Martin Gore
"Judas"
"A Question of Lust"
"Waiting for the Night"
"One Caress"
Song performed by Martin Gore 
"I Want You Now"
"One Caress"
"Somebody"
"In Your Room" (Alan Wilder on drums)
"Never Let Me Down Again" (Alan Wilder on drums)
"I Feel You" (Alan Wilder on drums, Martin Gore on guitar)
"Personal Jesus" (Alan Wilder on drums, Martin Gore on guitar)
 Encore 1

Song performed by Martin Gore
"Somebody"
"Fly on the Windscreen" *not played during some concerts
"Enjoy the Silence" (Martin Gore on guitar)
 Encore 2

"Policy of Truth" (Alan Wilder on drums) *not played past 04/14/94
"Clean" (Alan Wilder on drums) *not played during some concerts
"A Question of Time" (Alan Wilder on drums, Martin Gore on guitar)

Note: Setlists differed between dates, with rotated songs (denoted above) and song omissions.

Tour dates

Support acts
 Babasónicos (Buenos Aires)
 Juana la loca (Buenos Aires)
 Primal Scream (12 May – 8 July 1994)
 Stabbing Westward (selected dates)

Musicians

Depeche Mode
 Dave Gahan – lead vocals
 Martin Gore – guitar, synthesizers, samplers, lead and backing vocals
 Alan Wilder – synthesizers, samplers, piano, drums, percussion pads, backing vocals
 Andrew Fletcher – synthesizers, samplers (February and March dates only)

Backup musicians
 Daryl Bamonte – synthesizers, samplers (substituting for Andrew Fletcher in April–July dates)
 Hildia Campbell – backing vocals
 Samantha Smith – backing vocals

References

External links
 

Depeche Mode concert tours
1994 concert tours